The Street Player (translit. El harrif) is a 1983 Egyptian drama film directed by Mohamed Khan. It was entered into the 13th Moscow International Film Festival.

Cast
 Adel Emam as Fares
 Fardous Abdel Hamid as Dalal
 Nagah El-Mogui as Rizk
 Salah Nazmi
 Hamdi Al Wazir
 Abdalla Mahmoud as Mokhtar

References

External links
 

1983 films
1983 drama films
1980s Arabic-language films
Egyptian drama films